Charles Douglas Richardson (7 July 1853 – 15 October 1932) was a British-born Australian sculpture and painter.

Training
Trained at the Artisans School of Design, Trades Hall, Melbourne and later the National Gallery School, Melbourne and the London Royal Academy Schools, Richardson worked in various media and also exhibited many oils and watercolours. When in London he shared studios for a time with fellow students from Melbourne, Tom Roberts and Bertram Mackennal. Richardson was regarded as one of the most important artists of his generation in Melbourne during the late 1880s and the 1890s. He was discussed by critics as the equal of such artists as Tom Roberts, Arthur Streeton and Frederick McCubbin. Richardson's works were read as synonymous with the new nationalist school of plein air painters. At c. 1890, Richardson was a close associate of these artists, both personally and professionally. He showed both sculpted and painted "impressions" at the famed 9 by 5 Impression Exhibition, Melbourne August 1889, regarded as one of Australia's first modernist group shows with a manifesto. In c. 1880 he was a ringleader alongside Tom Roberts of student protests at the National Gallery school.

Presidency of Victorian Artists' Society
During the first world war he was elected as president of the Victorian Artists Society following dissatisfaction with Max Meldrum and his very vocal core of supporters. Although he was one of the longest serving presidents, Richardson is little remembered by that group.

Richardson's reputation has diminished amongst subsequent curators, critics and historians, partly because relatively few of the significant and highly regarded works that he was known to have produced came on the market, partly because his interest in symbolism and the British New Sculpture movement did not speak to the social realist values that were read into the plein air group by many later commentators. He is now read as a curious adjunct to the plein air school of painters known as the Heidelberg School rather than as the core figure that he once was.

Marriage
Relatively late in life in 1914 he married the sculptor Margaret Baskerville, who was one of the most high-profiled and proactively professional Australian women artists prior to Margaret Preston. Baskerville received many commissions but her work lacked the lyrical and poetic qualities of the best of Richardson's works

A recent bronze casting of his female figure, The Cloud, was set into a formal water garden beside the former Brighton Town Hall (Victoria, Australia) in the 1980s.

References

20th-century Australian sculptors
1853 births
1932 deaths
19th-century Australian sculptors
National Gallery of Victoria Art School alumni
Artists from Melbourne
English emigrants to colonial Australia
Alumni of the Royal Academy Schools
People educated at Scotch College, Melbourne